This is a list of United States bomber aircraft

1915–1935

1936–1945

1946–current

See also 
 Bomber
 List of bomber aircraft
 List of military aircraft of the United States
  Northrop Grumman B-21 Raider, US heavy bomber under development

References

Bibliography 

 
 
 

Lists of military aircraft
United States Army Air Forces lists